Khaterinne Medina (born 31 October 1992) is a Colombian rugby sevens player. She will be representing Colombia in rugby sevens as part of the Colombia women's national rugby sevens team at the 2016 Summer Olympics.

References

External links 
 

1992 births
Living people
Female rugby sevens players
Rugby sevens players at the 2016 Summer Olympics
Colombia international rugby sevens players
Colombia international women's rugby sevens players
Olympic rugby sevens players of Colombia
21st-century Colombian women